National Secondary Route 147, or just Route 147 (or ) is a National Road Route of Costa Rica, located in the San José, Alajuela provinces. It is locally known as either Radial Lindora, Radial San Antonio or Radial Santa Ana.

Description
A straight forward radial road, it spans the San Rafael district in Alajuela canton of Alajuela province, and Pozos, Santa Ana districts of Santa Ana canton, in San José province.  In Pozos district there is a junction with Route 27.

History
The bridge over Virilla river was widened in 2018, further lane widening is withhold due to expropriation process.

References

Highways in Costa Rica